Begowala railway stationis located in Begowala town, Sialkot district of Punjab province, Pakistan.

See also 
 List of railway stations in Pakistan
 Pakistan Railways

References

External links 

Railway stations in Sialkot District
Railway stations on Wazirabad–Narowal Branch Line